Gawi may refer to:

Gawi Rural LLG, local-level government (LLG) of East Sepik Province, Papua New Guinea
Nightmare (2000 film), South Korean film
Gau (territory) (Gothic: Gawi), Germanic term for a region
Gawi, a dialect of the Mser language in Cameroon and Chad

See also
Gawis, settlement in Sarawak, Malaysia
Kawi (disambiguation)